is a Japanese cyclist, who currently rides for UCI Continental team .

Major results

2017
 Asian Road Championships
1st Under-23 road race
2nd Team time trial
 1st Stage 2 Tour de Hokkaido
2018
 1st Stage 1 Tour de Taiwan
2019
 6th Tour de Okinawa
2021
 10th Road race, National Road Championships

References

External links

1995 births
Living people
Japanese male cyclists